Ophichthus brachynotopterus is an eel in the family Ophichthidae (worm/snake eels). It was described by Christine Karrer in 1983. It is a marine, deep water-dwelling eel which is known from Madagascar, in the western Indian Ocean. It dwells at a depth range .

References

brachynotopterus
Taxa named by Christine Karrer
Fish described in 1983